This article concerns the period 229 BC – 220 BC.

References